Halsbury's Laws is the name of a legal encyclopaedia produced by LexisNexis Butterworths.

 Halsbury's Laws of England
 Halsbury's Laws of Australia
 Halsbury's Laws of Canada
 Halsbury's Laws of Hong Kong

Law books